Gytha of Wessex (born c. 1053/1061 – died 1098 or 1107) was one of several daughters of Harold Godwinson, the last Anglo-Saxon king of England, and his consort, Edith the Fair. Through marriage to Vladimir II Monomakh, Gytha became a princess of Kievan Rus'.

Life
Her paternal grandparents were Godwin, Earl of Wessex and Gytha Thorkelsdóttir.

According to the thirteenth-century chronicler Saxo Grammaticus, after the death of their father King Harold at the Battle of Hastings in 1066, Gytha and two of her brothers (probably Magnus and either Godwin or Edmund) escaped to the court of their first cousin once-removed, King Sweyn Estridsson of Denmark. The two brothers were treated by Sweyn with hospitality, Magnus entering into high-level service with Bolesław II the Generous while Gytha was married to Waldemar, King of Ruthenia, i.e. Vladimir II Monomakh, one of the most famous rulers of Kievan Rus. This took place in 1069/1070 when Bolesław restored Grand Prince Iziaslav I of Kiev and Gertruda (Bolesław's aunt) to power after they had been deposed. Gytha's role in Vladimir's rule is not documented. Vladimir explained in a book of 'Instructions' (Pouchenie) for his sons, written in the twelfth-century: “Love your wives, but grant them no power over you.” In his book, Vladimir also mentioned the recent death of Yuri's mother.

Gytha was the mother of Mstislav the Great, the last ruler of united Kievan Rus. In the Norse sagas, Mstislav is called Harald, after his grandfather.
During her lifetime Gytha, as Vladimir's spouse, was princess of Smolensk, however she died before her husband became grand prince of Kiev (in 1113), so she never was grand princess of Kiev.

Children
With Vladimir, Gytha had several children, including:
Mstislav the Great (1076–1132)
Izyaslav Vladimirovich, Prince of Kursk († 6 September 1096)
Svyatoslav Vladimirovich, Prince of Smolensk and Pereyaslav († 16 March 1114)
Yaropolk II of Kiev († 18 February 1139)
Viacheslav I of Kiev († 2 February 1154)

Death date
There is a problem with establishing Gytha's date of death. It is placed between 1098 and 1107.
The patericon of St Pantaleon Cloister in Cologne says that "Gytha the Queen" (Gida regina) died as a nun on 10 March. The year is presumed to be 1098.

According to the "Testament of Vladimir Monomakh" Yuri Dolgorukiy's mother died on 7 May 1107. If Gytha died in 1098 then Yuri could have been a son of his father's second wife Yefimia (whom Vladimir Monomakh in this case supposedly married c.1099). However, it means there are no mentions in Vladimir Monomakh's works of Gytha's death, despite her being his first wife.  Yuri's birth then falls to c. 1099/1100. However, the Primary Chronicle records the first marriage of Yuri - on 12 January 1108. It means that Yuri was born before c.1099/1100 (as he could not have been 6–9 years old at the time of marriage). Then it means that Gytha could have been Yuri's mother and died in 1107.

Legacy
According to Russian politician and historian Vladimir Medinsky, Gytha was a significant influence on Monomakh's public relations: "Knyaz's English wife wasn't wasted". As a source, Medinsky quotes M. P. Akekseev's comparative analysis between Monomakh writings' and Alfred the Great's, and other anonymous then contemporary Anglo-Saxon texts.

Through her son Mstislav the Great she was an ancestor of both Philippa of Hainault and King Edward III of England, hence of all subsequent English and United Kingdom monarchs. Through Mstislav, she was also an ancestor of Alexander Nevsky and subsequent major Rurik rulers in Russian history, including Ivan I Kalita, Dmitry Donskoy, Ivan III the Great and first Tsar of Russia, Ivan IV the Terrible.

Family trees
Cnut the Great's family tree

References

Sources
Necrologium Sanctis Pantalaeonis Coloniensis, in Rheinische Urbare: Sammlung von Urbaren und anderen Quellen zur rheinischen Wirtschaftsgeschichte (Bonn, 1902), vol. 1. 
Saxo Grammaticus, Gesta Danorum: The History of the Danes, 2 vols. (Oxford, 2015). 
 
T. Zajac, 'Marriage Impediments in Canon Law and Practice: Consanguinity Regulations and the Case of Orthodox-Catholic Intermarriage in Kyivan Rus, ca. 1000 – 1250,' in Proceedings of the Fourteenth International Congress of Medieval Canon Law, Toronto, 5–11 August 2012, ed. Joseph Goering, Stephan Dusil, and Andreas Thier (Vatican City, 2016), pp. 711–29.
T. Zajac, ‘The social-political roles of the princess in Kyivan Rus’, ca. 945–1240,’ in E. Woodacre, ed., A Global Companion to Queenship (Leeds, 2018), pp. 125–146.

External links
S. Lewis, 'Gytha of Wessex, an Anglo-Saxon Russian Princess', blogpost

Further reading
Alexander Nazarenko. Древняя Русь на международных путях. Moscow, 2001. . (Russian)

11th-century births
Year of birth unknown
1098 deaths
1107 deaths
Year of death uncertain
Burials at Saint Sophia Cathedral, Kyiv
11th-century English people
11th-century English women
English princesses
11th-century Rus' people
11th-century Rus' women
House of Godwin
Anglo-Norse women
Anglo-Saxon women
Anglo-Saxon royalty
Kievan Rus' princesses
Rurik dynasty
Daughters of kings